Devarapalli is a village in West Godavari district in the state of Andhra Pradesh in India. It is located in Devarapalli mandal in Kovvur revenue division and Gopalapuram Assembly Constituency

Demographics 

 Census of India, Devarapalli had a population of 14796. The total population constitute, 7399 males and 7397 females with a sex ratio of 1000 females per 1000 males. 1546 children are in the age group of 0–6 years, with sex ratio of 1000. The average literacy rate stands at 71.65%.

References 

Villages in West Godavari district